Kulen Promtep Wildlife Sanctuary is one of the largest protected areas in Cambodia and was set aside to protect the critically endangered, possibly extinct Kouprey. It was created by royal decree in 1993. 

Kulen Promtep Wildlife Sanctuary is one of the last places on the planet where the giant ibis, a critically endangered species, can be found. It is also the national bird of Cambodia. The sanctuary is supported with the help of private donations as well as through an ethical eco-volunteer program.

Geography
It is located in the northern plains of Cambodia, near the border to Thailand.

The sanctuary contains lowland forest as well as the largest swamp in the country. It is part of the Northern Plains Dry Forest Priority Corridor.

References

External links 
 Map of protected areas in Cambodia
 The Cambodia Wildlife Sanctuary
 Reducing Forest Clearance through Sustainable Land Management in Kulen Promtep Wildlife Sanctuary and Preah Vihear Protected Forest, Preah Vihear (KHM/07/13)

Wildlife sanctuaries of Cambodia
Protected areas of Cambodia
Protected areas established in 1993
Geography of Siem Reap province
Geography of Preah Vihear province